Beryllium-10 (10Be) is a radioactive isotope of beryllium. It is formed in the Earth's atmosphere mainly by cosmic ray spallation of nitrogen and oxygen. Beryllium-10 has a half-life of 1.39 × 106 years, and decays by beta decay to stable boron-10 with a maximum energy of 556.2 keV. It decays through the reaction 10Be→10B + e−. Light elements in the atmosphere react with high energy galactic cosmic ray particles. The spallation of the reaction products is the source of 10Be (t, u particles like n or p):
14N(t,5u)10Be; Example: 14N(n,p α)10Be 
16O(t,7u)10Be

Because beryllium tends to exist in solutions below about pH 5.5 (and rainwater above many industrialized areas can have a pH less than 5), it will dissolve and be transported to the Earth's surface via rainwater. As the precipitation quickly becomes more alkaline, beryllium drops out of solution. Cosmogenic 10Be thereby accumulates at the soil surface, where its relatively long half-life (1.387 million years) permits a long residence time before decaying to 10B.

10Be and its daughter product have been used to examine soil erosion, soil formation from regolith, the development of lateritic soils and the age of ice cores. It is also formed in nuclear explosions by a reaction of fast neutrons with 13C in the carbon dioxide in air, and is one of the historical indicators of past activity at nuclear test sites. 10Be decay is a significant isotope used as a proxy data measure for cosmogenic nuclides to characterize solar and extra-solar attributes of the past from terrestrial samples.

See also
 Surface exposure dating

References

Isotopes of beryllium
Radionuclides used in radiometric dating